The following is a list of eponymous streets and squares in Metro Manila — that is, streets or roads and plazas named after people — with notes on the link between the road/plaza and the person.

Streets

Gallery

List

Squares and plazas

Notes

References

Metro Manila
Streets
 
Streets